The Three Passions is a 1928 British silent drama film directed by Rex Ingram and starring Alice Terry, Iván Petrovich and Shayle Gardner. It was made as a quota film for Allied Artists and was based on a novel by Cosmo Hamilton. It was filmed on the French Riviera.

Cast
 Alice Terry as Lady Victoria Burlington
 Iván Petrovich as Philip Burlington
 Shayle Gardner as Lord Bellamont
 Clare Eames as Lady Bellamont
 Leslie Faber as Father Aloysius
 Gerald Fielding as Bobbie
 Andrews Engelmann as Hairless Man

References

Bibliography
 Low, Rachael. The History of British Film, Volume 4 1918-1929. Routledge, 1997.

External links

Progressive Silent Film List: The Three Passions at silentera.com

1928 films
1928 drama films
British silent feature films
Films directed by Rex Ingram
Films shot in France
Films based on British novels
British drama films
British black-and-white films
1929 drama films
1929 films
1920s English-language films
1920s British films
Silent drama films